Exeter High School is the name of several high schools, including:

In Australia:
Exeter High School (Tasmania)

In the United States (listed alphabetically by state):
Exeter Union High School in Exeter, California
Exeter High School (New Hampshire) in Exeter, New Hampshire
Exeter Township Senior High School in Reading, Pennsylvania